Alfred's Well is a hamlet in the civil parish of Dodford in the Bromsgrove District of Worcestershire, England. Its nearest town is Bromsgrove.

References
http://data.ordnancesurvey.co.uk/doc/50kGazetteer/3260

Villages in Worcestershire